Chépy is a commune in the Somme department in Hauts-de-France in northern France.

Geography

Population

Controversy
In 2015, the official spelling of the name of the commune is "Chépy" as specified by the Official Geographical Code of the French Republic. Some inhabitants in this commune believe the spelling "Chépy" is wrong and should be replaced by "Chepy" and pronounced thus.

See also
Communes of the Somme department
Réseau des Bains de Mer

References

Communes of Somme (department)